2C-T-2 is a psychedelic and entactogenic phenethylamine of the 2C family. It was first synthesized in 1981 by Alexander Shulgin, and rated by him as one of the "magical half-dozen" most important psychedelic phenethylamine compounds.  The drug has structural and pharmacodynamic properties similar to those of 2C-T-7 ("Blue Mystic").

Dosage
In Alexander Shulgin's book PiHKAL, the dosage range is listed as 12 to 25 mg.

Pharmacology
The mechanism of action that produces 2C-T-2’s hallucinogenic and entheogenic effects is shown to be most likely a result from action as a 5-HT2A, 5-HT2B, and 5-HT2C serotonin receptor agonist, a mechanism of action shared by the hallucinogenic tryptamines and phenethylamines to varying degrees. 2C-T-2 has also shown to be a partial agonist of adrenergic receptors.

Dangers
A potential risk of neurotoxicity from 2C-T-2 use (and 2C chemical series in general) has been shown in serotonergic and dopaminergic containing neurons. This has also been shown to be magnified in serotonergic-containing cells with combined use of 2C series drugs with alcohol, MDMA, and methamphetamine.

Severe 'intoxication' on 2C series drugs has been observed as behavior that includes: intense hallucinations, agitation, aggression, violence, dysphoria, hypertension, tachycardia, seizures, and hyperthermia.

Drug prohibition laws

Argentina
2C-T-2 is also a controlled substance in Argentina as well as 2C-B and 2C-I.

Canada
As of October 31, 2016, 2C-T-2 is a controlled substance (Schedule III) in Canada.

China
As of October 2015 2C-T-2 is a controlled substance in China.

Netherlands
The Netherlands became the first country in the world to ban 2C-T-2, and classify it as a hard drug, by law. In April, 1999, 2C-T-2 became a list I drug of the Opium Law.

Sweden
Schedule I in Sweden.

2C-T-2 was first classified as "health hazard" under the act Lagen om förbud mot vissa hälsofarliga varor (translated Act on the Prohibition of Certain Goods Dangerous to Health) as of April 1, 1999, under SFS 1999:58 that made it illegal to sell or possess.

The Riksdag added 2C-T-2 to Narcotic Drugs Punishments Act under Swedish schedule I ("substances, plant materials and fungi which normally do not have medical use") as of March 16, 2004, published by Medical Products Agency (MPA) in regulation LVFS 2004:3 listed as 2C-T-2, 2,5-dimetoxi-4-etyltiofenetylamin.

United Kingdom
2C-T-2 and all other compounds featured in PiHKAL are illegal drugs in the United Kingdom.

United States
2C-T-2 is specifically listed as a schedule I substance under SEC. 1152 of S.3187: Food and Drug Administration Safety and Innovation Act of 2012.

Australia
2C-T-2 is considered a Schedule 9 prohibited substance in Australia under the Poisons Standard (October 2015). A Schedule 9 substance is a substance which may be abused or misused, the manufacture, possession, sale or use of which should be prohibited by law except when required for medical or scientific research, or for analytical, teaching or training purposes with approval of Commonwealth and/or State or Territory Health Authorities.

References

External links 
 2C-T-2 vault at Erowid
 Sulfurous Samadhi: An Investigation of 2C-T-2 & 2C-T-7

2C (psychedelics)
Designer drugs
O-methylated phenols
Thioethers
Substances discovered in the 1980s